James Cunneen is an American politician from the state of California.

Cunneen served as an aide to Republican Party politicians Becky Morgan, Ed Zschau, and Tom Campbell, before going to work in the semiconductor industry. He served in the California State Assembly Representing the 24th District from 1994 through 2000. Cunneen was president of the San Jose Silicon Valley Chamber of Commerce from 2001 to 2005, and then worked for Cisco Systems for two years.

References

External links

Living people
Republican Party members of the California State Assembly
1961 births
University of California, Los Angeles alumni
People from Stanford, California